Esfahanak or Isfahanak or Esfehanak may refer to the following places in Iran:

Isfahan Province
 Esfehanak, Isfahan
 Esfahanak-e Abdol
 Esfahanak-e Moshai
 Esfahanak-e Olya
 Esfahanak-e Saki
 Esfahanak-e Sofla

Other provinces
 Esfahanak, Markazi, Markazi Province
 Esfahanak (Tehran), a neighbourhood of Greater Tehran